E. Thurman Gaskill (born April 4, 1935 - March 7, 2023) was an American politician who served as an Iowa State Senator from the 6th District and Assistant Majority Leader of the Iowa Senate. Gaskill was a grain farmer and a director of Meta Financial Group, Incorporated, a bank holding company. He served in the Iowa Senate 1997–2007. He also was a commissioner of both Iowa's Department of Economic Development and its Department of Natural Resources, president of Iowa Corn Growers Association, president of National Corn Growers Association, chairman of the United States Feed Grains Council, and held other agriculture positions.

In his last term Gaskill served on several committees in the Iowa Senate, the Agriculture committee; the Appropriations committee; the State Government committee; and the Natural Resources and Environment committee, where he was the ranking member. He was ranking member of the Agriculture and Natural Resources Appropriations Subcommittee.

Gaskill was re-elected in 2004 with 17,192 votes (58%), defeating Democrat John Drury.  He did not seek re-election to the Senate in the 2008 elections.

He supported Rudolph Giuliani in the 2008 Republican presidential primary campaign as Iowa chairman of Farmers for Rudy, and as a national co-chairman.

In 2009, Wallaces' Farmer magazine honored Mr. Gaskill and his wife Gerry, along with three other families, as Iowa Master Farmers.

He graduated from Corwith High School in 1953 and attended Iowa State University. He served in the United States Army 1954-1956.

He began farming in 1958 on rented property and expanded over the years, purchasing his own land. He was inducted into the Agricultural Hall of Fame in the Spring of 1975.

References

External links
Iowa General Assembly - former Senator E. Thurman Gaskill official IA Senate website

Follow the Money - E. Thurman Gaskill
2006 2004 2000 1998 campaign contributions

1935 births
Living people
American business executives
Businesspeople from Iowa
Republican Party Iowa state senators
Methodists from Iowa
People from Hancock County, Iowa
People from Algona, Iowa
Farmers from Iowa
Iowa State University alumni
United States Army soldiers